The 1901 University of Utah football team was an American football team that represented the University of Utah as an independent during the 1901 college football season. In its second season under head coach Harvey Holmes, the team compiled a 5–1 record and outscored opponents by a total of 111 to 6.

Schedule

References

University of Utah
Utah Utes football seasons
University of Utah football